Brian Hartnett (born 1992) is an Irish hurler who plays for Cork Championship club Russell Rovers. He previously lined out with Midleton and the Cork senior hurling team.

Career

Hartnett first played hurling as a schoolboy with Midleton CBS Secondary School with whom he lined out in the Harty Cup. He subsequently lined out with University College Cork and won consecutive Fitzgibbon Cup titles. Hartnett began his club career with Russell Rovers before winning a Cork SHC title with Midleton in 2013. After returning to Russell Rovers he lined out in the 2020 All-Ireland junior final defeat by Conahy Shamrocks. Hartnett first appeared on the inter-county scene during a two-year stint with the Cork minor hurling team before later playing with the under-21 and intermediate teams. He first played with the Cork senior hurling team during the pre-season Waterford Crystal Cup in 2011 and remained on the panel for a number of seasons. His brother, Kevin Hartnett, has also lined out with Cork at various levels.

Career statistics

Honours

University College Cork
Fitzgibbon Cup: 2012, 2013

Russell Rovers
Munster Junior Club Hurling Championship: 2019
Cork Junior A Hurling Championship: 2019
East Cork Junior A Hurling Championship: 2018, 2019

Midleton
Cork Senior Hurling Championship: 2013

References

1992 births
Living people
Russell Rovers hurlers
Midleton hurlers
Cork inter-county hurlers